Ruth Herstein was an American chess player, U.S. Women's Chess Championship medalist (1975, 1976)

Biography
In the 1970s, Ruth Herstein was one of the leading female chess players in the United States. She often participated in the United States Women's Chess Championship, which achieved the best results in 1975 and 1976 when she shared second and third place.

Ruth Herstein played for United States in the Women's Chess Olympiads:
 In 1974, at second board in the 6th Chess Olympiad (women) in Medellín (+7, =2, -2),
 In 1976, at third board in the 7th Chess Olympiad (women) in Haifa (+4, =3, -2),
 In 1978, at third board in the 8th Chess Olympiad (women) in Buenos Aires (+4, =0, -6).

References

External links
 
 
 
 

American female chess players
Women's Championship
20th-century chess players
20th-century American women
1932 births
1999 deaths